Kostrzyn railway station is a railway station serving the town of Kostrzyn nad Odrą, in the Lubusz Voivodeship, Poland. The station is located on the Tczew–Kostrzyn railway, Wrocław–Szczecin railway and the now closed Grzmiąca–Kostrzyn railway.

It is a unique station, one of two of its kind in Poland, with two levels of platforms oriented in different directions: north-south (Wrocław–Szczecin) and east–west (Tczew–Kostrzyn).

The train services are operated by PKP, Polregio, Arriva and Niederbarnimer Eisenbahn.

History
The station building was built between 1872 and 1874 and is one of the few buildings in town not destroyed during World War II. The station was repaired after the war. In 2012 the station underwent a major renovation, which was completed in Autumn 2014. The historic facade of the building was restored during these works.

Train services
The station is served by the following service(s):

Intercity services Świnoujście – Szczecin – Kostrzyn – Rzepin – Zielona Góra – Wrocław
Regional services (R) Szczecin – Kostrzyn – Rzepin – Zielona Góra
Regional services (R) Berlin Ostkreuz – Kostrzyn (– Gorzów Wielkopolski – Krzyż)
Regional services (R) Kostrzyn – Gorzów Wielkopolski – Krzyż (– Poznań)
Intercity services (TLK) Gdynia Główna — Kostrzyn 

From 2004 to 2019, the station welcomed a large number of extra trains from all over the country as part of the annual Woodstock Festival.

References

 This article is based upon a translation of the Polish language version as of November 2016.

External links

Railway stations in Poland opened in 1857
Railway stations in Lubusz Voivodeship
1857 establishments in Prussia